Namachoerus was an extinct genus of even-toed ungulates that existed during the Miocene of Africa.

One species, Namachoerus moruoroti was formerly placed in the genus Lopholistriodon.

References

Prehistoric Suidae
Miocene even-toed ungulates
Prehistoric even-toed ungulate genera
Miocene mammals of Africa